Fluorine-18 (18F) is a fluorine radioisotope which is an important source of positrons. It has a mass of 18.0009380(6) u and its half-life is 109.771(20) minutes. It decays by positron emission 96% of the time and electron capture 4% of the time. Both modes of decay yield stable oxygen-18.

Natural occurrence 
 is a natural trace radioisotope produced by cosmic ray spallation of atmospheric argon as well as by reaction of protons with natural oxygen: 18O + p → 18F + n.

Synthesis 
In the radiopharmaceutical industry, fluorine-18 is made using either a cyclotron or linear particle accelerator to bombard a target, usually of natural or enriched [18O]water with high energy protons (typically ~18 MeV). The fluorine produced is in the form of a water solution of [18F]fluoride, which is then used in a rapid chemical synthesis of various radio pharmaceuticals. The organic oxygen-18 pharmaceutical molecule is not made before the production of the radiopharmaceutical, as high energy protons destroy such molecules (radiolysis). Radiopharmaceuticals using fluorine must therefore be synthesized after the fluorine-18 has been produced.

History 
First published synthesis and report of properties of fluorine-18 were in 1937 by Arthur H. Snell, produced by the nuclear reaction of 20Ne(d,α)18F in the cyclotron laboratories of Ernest O. Lawrence.

Chemistry 
Fluorine-18 is often substituted for a hydroxyl group  in a radiotracer parent molecule, due to similar steric and electrostatic properties. This may however be problematic in certain applications due to possible changes in the molecule polarity.

Applications 
Fluorine-18 is one of the early tracers used in positron emission tomography (PET), having been in use since the 1960s.
Its significance is due to both its short half-life and the emission of positrons when decaying. 
A major medical use of fluorine-18 is: in positron emission tomography (PET) to image the brain and heart; to image the thyroid gland; as a radiotracer to image bones, looking for cancers that have metastasized from other locations in the body and in radiation therapy treating internal tumors.

Tracers include sodium fluoride which can be useful for skeletal imaging as it displays high and rapid bone uptake accompanied by very rapid blood clearance, which results in a high bone-to-background ratio in a short time and
fluorodeoxyglucose (FDG), where the 18F substitutes a hydroxyl.
New dioxaborolane chemistry enables radioactive fluoride (18F) labeling of antibodies, which allows for positron emission tomography (PET) imaging of cancer. A Human-Derived, Genetic, Positron-emitting and Fluorescent (HD-GPF) reporter system uses a human protein, PSMA and non-immunogenic, and a small molecule that is positron-emitting (18F) and fluorescent for dual modality PET and fluorescence imaging of genome modified cells, e.g. cancer, CRISPR/Cas9, or CAR T-cells, in an entire mouse. The dual-modality small molecule targeting PSMA was tested in humans and found the location of primary and metastatic prostate cancer, fluorescence-guided removal of cancer, and detects single cancer cells in tissue margins.

References 

Isotopes of fluorine
Medicinal radiochemistry
Positron emitters
Medical isotopes